Bishr ibn Safwan al-Kalbi (died 727) was a provincial governor for the Umayyad Caliphate, serving in Egypt (720–721) and Ifriqiyah (721–727).

Career
The son of one Safwan ibn Tuwayl, Bishr was an Arab of the Banu Kalb tribe. He and his family traced their genealogy back to the pre-Islamic chieftain Zuhayr ibn Janab.

In 720 Bishr was appointed governor of Egypt by the caliph Yazid ibn Abd al-Malik as a replacement for Ayyub ibn Sharhabil. During his time in that province, he cancelled several measures that had been enacted by his predecessor, including a salary increase for the local Muslims and fiscal exemptions for Christian churches, and implemented a reform of the diwan registers by segregating members of the Quda'ah from those of other tribes. It was also during Bishr's governorship that the city of Tinnis came under attack by the Byzantines, resulting in the deaths of several Muslims there.

In 721 Bishr was ordered by Yazid to establish himself in Ifriqiyah (North Africa) following the murder of its governor Muhammad ibn Yazid, and he accordingly set out west, leaving his brother Hanzalah ibn Safwan to govern Egypt in his stead. Upon arriving in the province, he was informed that Abdallah ibn Musa ibn Nusayr had been behind Muhammad's death and wrote to Yazid of the matter. After receiving Yazid's reply that Abdallah should be put to death, Bishr executed him and sent his head on to the caliph. He also proceeded to confiscate Abdallah's property and implemented punitive measures against his former associates.

In 723 Bishr set out from Ifriqiyah to meet the caliph in person, but while en route he learned that Yazid had died and been succeeded by Hisham ibn Abd al-Malik. Bishr therefore presented the new caliph with the tribute that had been meant for Yazid; Hisham responded by re-confirming his governorship over Ifriqiyah, and afterwards sent him to return to the province.

While in Ifriqiyah Bishr dispatched his commanders on regular campaigns against Byzantine targets in the Mediterranean Sea. Sardinia came under attack in 721 and 727, while in 724 both Sardinia and Corsica were struck; raids against unknown objectives were also made in 722 and 726. Bishr himself led an expedition against Sicily which resulted in the acquisition of spoils, but this offensive ended badly when storms overtook his fleet and caused much of his army to perish.

Bishr died in Kairouan of disease in 727, and was afterwards replaced with Ubaydah ibn Abd al-Rahman al-Qaysi.

Notes

References
 
 
 
 
 
 
 
 
 
 
 
 
 

727 deaths
8th-century Umayyad governors of Egypt
Year of birth unknown
8th-century Arabs
Banu Kalb
Umayyad governors of Ifriqiya
8th-century people of Ifriqiya